Kryoneri (Greek: Κρυονέρι meaning "cold water") may refer to numerous settlements in Greece:

Kryoneri, Achaea, a village in Achaea, part of the municipality Kalavryta
Kryoneri, Aetolia-Acarnania, a village in Aetolia-Acarnania, part of the municipal unit Chalkeia
Kryoneri, Attica, a community in East Attica 
Kryoneri, Corinthia, a village in Corinthia, part of the municipality Sikyona
Kryoneri, Figaleia, a village in Elis, part of the municipality Figaleia
Kryoneri, Olympia, a village in Elis, part of the municipality Archaia Olympia
Kryoneri, Ioannina, a village in the Ioannina regional unit, part of the municipality Delvinaki
Kryoneri, Karditsa, a village in the Karditsa regional unit
Kryoneri, Kavala, a village in the Kavala regional unit, part of the municipal unit Filippoi
Kryoneri, Laconia, a village in Laconia, part of the municipality Oitylo
Kryoneri, Messenia, a village in Messenia, part of the municipality Aetos
Kryoneri, Rethymno, a village in the Rethymno regional unit, part of the municipality Kouloukonas
Kryoneri, Thesprotia, a village in Thesprotia, part of the municipality Filiates
Kryoneri, Thessaloniki, a village in the Thessaloniki regional unit, part of the municipality Sochos

See also

Kryoneria, a village in Aetolia-Acarnania, part of the municipality Apodotia 
Kryonerida, a municipality in the Chania regional unit on Crete
Kryoneritis, a village in Euboea, part of the municipality Istiaia